Karl-Heinz Henrichs (1 July 1942 – 3 April 2008) was a German racing cyclist. Together with his teammates he won the gold medal in the team pursuit at the 1964 Summer Olympics in Tokyo and the silver medal at the 1968 Summer Olympics in Mexico City.

External links
 
 
 
 Obituary at RC Bocholt 

1942 births
2008 deaths
German male cyclists
Olympic gold medalists for the United Team of Germany
Olympic silver medalists for West Germany
Cyclists at the 1964 Summer Olympics
Cyclists at the 1968 Summer Olympics
Olympic cyclists of the United Team of Germany
Olympic cyclists of West Germany
German track cyclists
Olympic medalists in cycling
People from Wesel (district)
Sportspeople from Düsseldorf (region)
Cyclists from North Rhine-Westphalia
Medalists at the 1964 Summer Olympics
Medalists at the 1968 Summer Olympics
20th-century German people